West End Line may refer to:

BMT West End Line, a line of the New York City Subway
West End Line (Brooklyn surface), a former surface transit line in Brooklyn, New York City